Paul Otto is a professor of American history at George Fox University, and a researcher in the area of Dutch-Native American relations and wampum.

Education and career
Otto received his BA (1987) from Dordt University, his MA (1990) from Western Washington University, and his PhD (1995) in early American and Native American history at Indiana University. Otto has taught at Calvin University and Dordt University and currently teaches at George Fox University in Newberg, Oregon, where he has been since 2002. He has served as the chair of their History, Sociology, & Politics Department, 2005-2019. He teaches courses on American history, Latin America, and Southern Africa, with a particular interest in issues of race and ethnicity. In 2010, Otto received a faculty achievement award for research as an undergraduate professor at George Fox University.

Scholarship
Otto's scholarship has focused on the relations between the Dutch and Native Americans in colonial New York. Otto was recognized as a Fulbright scholar in the Netherlands in 1993-1994. His scholarship and first book, The Dutch-Munsee Encounter in America: The Struggle for Sovereignty in the Hudson Valley, published by Berghahn Press, led him to receive the Hendricks Award in 1998. Further, Otto has been recognized as a fellow of the New Netherland Institute and the Holland Society of New York. His work has also been cited in history textbooks covering the period, such as Eric Nellis's Empire of Regions, and Alan Gallay's Colonial & Revolutionary America, and in journal articles such as one by Nancy Hagedorn, who cited Otto's work as exemplifying a trend in American historical scholarship towards a "more intricate and subtle, but also more representative, vision of early America".

Otto is currently researching wampum in the colonial northeast, and has delivered lectures on the subject at forums such as SUNY New Paltz's Henry Hudson Symposium.

He has received an Andrew Mellon Fellowship at the Henry E. Huntington Library (San Marino, California), an Earhart Research Grant, and a National Endowment for the Humanities Summer Stipend. In 2015-2016, he was a fellow at the National Humanities Center. He has also served as co-editor of the Journal of Early American History.

Publications
The Dutch-Munsee Encounter in America: The Struggle for Sovereignty in the Hudson Valley. New York: Berghahn Press, 2006.
Permeable Borders: History, Theory, Policy, and Practice in the United States. Co-editor with Susanne Bertheir-Foglar. New York: Berghahn Press, 2020.
"Wampum: The Transfer and Creation of Rituals on the Early American Frontier." In Ritual Dynamics and the Science of Ritual, vol 5, Transfer and Spaces, ed. Gita Dharampal-Frick, Robert Langer, and Niles Holger Petersen, 171-188.Wiesbaden: Harrassowitz Books, 2010.
"Intercultural Relations between Natives and Europeans in New Netherland." In Four Centuries of Dutch-American Relations, 1609-2009, ed. Cornelis A. van Minnen, Hans Krabbendam, and Giles Scott-Smith, 178-191. Albany: SUNY Press, 2009.
“The Origins of New Netherland: Interpreting Native American Responses to Henry Hudson's Visit.” Itinerario (European Journal of Overseas History) 18, no. 2 (1994): 22-39.
“Reassessing American Frontier Theory: Culture, Cultural Relativism, and the Middle Ground.” In Frontiers and Boundaries in United States History, ed. Cornelis A. van Minnen & Sylvia Hinton, 27-38. Amsterdam: VU University Press, 2004.

References

External links
Otto lecturing on the history of wampum

Historians of Native Americans
George Fox University faculty
Western Washington University alumni
Indiana University alumni
Dordt University alumni
Living people
Year of birth missing (living people)
Place of birth missing (living people)
Dordt University faculty
Calvin University faculty